Winslow Memorial Park (also known as Winslow Park) is a coastal park and campground in Freeport, Maine, United States. The northern side of the park looks out over Staples Cove.

The park, which is owned by the Town of Freeport, is a popular camping ground between May and October annually, with around one hundred plots set out either side of Winslow Park Way, which leads northeast to the tip of the peninsula, known as Stockbridge Point, on which the park is located. A children's playground is located at the western end of the park, near the parking lot.

A self-funded facility, it grossed revenue of $346,000 in 2019 and $255,000 in 2020, the first full year of the COVID-19 pandemic.

History 
The park is named for Delia B. Powers Winslow. It was gifted to the town by her daughter, Adelaide Winslow Harb, in 1953. Harb Cottage, a rental property, is located at the eastern end of Winslow Park Way.

References 

Parks in Cumberland County, Maine
Freeport, Maine
Campgrounds in Maine
1953 establishments in Maine